Dialysis fasciventris is a species of fly in the family Xylophagidae.

Distribution
United States.

References

Xylophagidae
Taxa named by Hermann Loew
Insects described in 1874
Diptera of North America